My Little Sister is a lost 1919 silent film drama directed by Kenean Buel and starring Evelyn Nesbit. It was produced and distributed by the Fox Film Corporation.

Cast
Evelyn Nesbit – The Elder Sister
Leslie Austin – Eric (*Leslie Austen)
Lillian Hall – Bettina
Kempton Greene – Ranny
Lyster Chambers – The Stranger
Herbert Standing – Guy Whitby Dawson
Carolyn Lee – Madame Aurore (*Caroline Lee)
Amelia Summerville – The Gray Hawk
Ben Hendricks – The Colonel
Louise Rial – Aunt Josephine
Martha Mayo – The Sisters' Mother
Marie Burke – Lady Helmstone
Henry Hallam – Lord Helmstone
Lucille Carney – Lady Barbara

See also
1937 Fox vault fire

References

External links

1919 films
American silent feature films
American black-and-white films
Fox Film films
Films directed by Kenean Buel
Silent American drama films
1919 drama films
Lost American films
1919 lost films
Lost drama films
1910s American films